The Sustainable Transport Award (STA) is presented annually to a city that has shown leadership and vision in the field of sustainable transportation and urban livability in the preceding year. Nominations are accepted from anyone, and winners and honourable mentions are chosen by the Sustainable Transport Award Steering Committee.

Since 2005, the award has been given out annually to a city or major jurisdiction that has implemented innovative transportation strategies, especially in several different areas of sustainable transportation. The award rewards cities for improving mobility for residents, reducing transportation greenhouse gas and air pollution emissions, and improving safety and access for bicyclists and pedestrians.

Finalists are invited to an award ceremony during the Transportation Research Board’s annual conference in Washington, DC in January, where the winner and honourable mentions are announced at the ceremony.

The STA directs international attention to cities on the cutting edge of transportation policy. By highlighting successfully completed programs and emphasising transfer-ability, the award helps disseminate new ideas and best practices, while encouraging cities worldwide to improve their own livability. Noteworthy projects include the construction or expansion of BRT or LRT systems, bike shares or bike lanes, attention to low-income access to transportation, reform of parking or zoning regulations, and linking transportation and development practices (TOD).

Process

Criteria 

STAs are awarded to cities that have demonstrated significant progress in using transportation to create a more sustainable, livable city. The Sustainable Transport Award looks for cities working in several of the following policy areas:

Improvements to public transportation, such as implementing a new mass transit system (e.g. bus rapid transit), expanding the existing systems to increase accessibility and coverage, or improving customer service.
Improvements to non-motorized travel, such as the implementation or expansion of bike share programs and bike lanes, the creation of pedestrian walkways, and improvements to street crossings and sidewalks.
Expansion or improvement to public space often includes the creation of open plazas, creating pedestrian-only zones, installing street lamps or trees along sidewalks, and pedestrian safety measures.
Implementation of travel demand management programs to reduce private car use, which can include car-free days or zones, changes to parking requirements or availability, the implementation or expansion of car share systems, congestion charging, and structured tolls and fees.
Reduction of urban sprawl by linking transportation to development (TOD) can be done through changes to zoning laws and providing incentives to developers.
Reduction of transport-related air pollution and greenhouse gas emissions, by creating pollution laws, mandating air quality controls, restricting vehicle access, and creating an air advisory system.

To be eligible for an STA, cities must have made significant progress in the past year addressing sustainable transit. Awards are presented for projects implemented in the previous year, rather than for planned activity or simply beginning construction.

Nominations 

Cities must be nominated to be considered for the award. Nominations can come from government agencies, including the Mayor's office, NGOs, consultants, academics, or anyone else with a close working knowledge of the city's projects. Applicants are asked to provide program details, impact, significance, outcomes, transferability, and images.

Steering Committee 

Final selection of the award recipient and honorable mentions is conducted by a steering committee, composed of experts and organizations working internationally on sustainable transportation. The committee includes the Institute for Transportation and Development Policy (ITDP), EMBARQ, World Bank, GIZ, Clean Air Institute, Clean Air Asia, ICLEI’s EcoMobility, Transportation Research Laboratory (TRL), and Despacio  The committee looks for projects completed in the previous year that demonstrate innovation and success in improving sustainable transportation.

Past winners 
2005: Bogotá, Colombia
2006: Seoul, South Korea
2007: Guayaquil, Ecuador
2008: Paris, France and London, United Kingdom
2009: New York City
2010: Ahmedabad, India
2011: Guangzhou, China
2012: Medellín, Colombia and San Francisco, US
2013: Mexico City
2014: Buenos Aires, Argentina
2015: Belo Horizonte, Rio de Janeiro, and São Paulo, Brazil
2016: Yichang, China
2017: Santiago, Chile
2018: Dar es Salaam, Tanzania
2019: Fortaleza, Brazil
2020: Pune, India
2021: Jakarta, Indonesia
2022: Bogotá, Colombia
2023: Paris, France

Bogotá, Colombia 

2005: The first annual Sustainable Transport Award was presented to Bogotá in recognition of the city’s success in implementing the TransMilenio BRT, integrating bicycle infrastructure with mass transit, and redefining and reclaiming public space for its citizens. Mayor Enrique Peñalosa’s vision and implementation helped transform  Bogotá into a model livable city and set a precedent for subsequent years’ STA cities.

Seoul, South Korea 

2006: Under the leadership of Mayor Myung Bak Lee, a four-mile elevated highway that once covered the Cheonggyecheon River in the city center was replaced with a riverfront park, high quality walkways, and public squares. Exclusive bus lanes were constructed along 36 miles of congested streets, and the city government initiated plans for additional bus lanes as part of a broader initiative to improve all aspects of the city's bus system.

Guayaquil, Ecuador 

2007: The 2007 launch of the first 15 kilometers of Guayaquil’s new bus rapid transit system, Metrovia, brought cleaner, higher quality service and reduced trip times in key travel corridors to city residents. Further improvements to the city included the refurbishment of previously deteriorated public spaces, such as the waterfront and Santa Ana district, which encouraged pedestrian use and increased development in the city.

Paris, France and London, United Kingdom 

 2008: In recognition of Paris and London’s exemplary programs in bike share and congestion pricing, respectively, the two cities shared the 2008 award.

The Paris bike share program, Vélib (“Freedom Bikes”), revolutionized bike sharing. By the end of 2007, Vélib had more than 1,200  stations and 15,000 bikes. This enormously successful bike share system complements other aspects of Paris’ new mobility plan, such as renovating public squares and plazas, widening sidewalks, and opening a new BRT system. These improvements led to a decrease in private vehicle traffic by 20 percent and a nine percent reduction in carbon dioxide emissions.

London is the largest city to adopt congestion pricing, and its success has inspired cities around the globe. In 2007, London expanded on the success of its groundbreaking 2003 congestion pricing plan with a doubling of the congestion zone, increased fees for motor vehicles, and new citywide emission-based tolls that are spurring more rapid adoption of cleaner, fuel-efficient vehicles. The new pricing causes a 21-perfect drop in congestion, 70,000 fewer vehicles entering the extended congestion pricing zone daily, a 45 percent increase in bus ridership, and a 42 percent increase in bike use from 2007.

New York City, United States 

 2009: New York City demonstrated that political will, bold leadership, and citizen engagement can lead to sweeping transportation reforms. In 2008, the city implemented key parts of Mayor Michael Bloomberg's long-term sustainability vision,  PlaNYC 2030. The laudable changes made throughout 2008 have reshaped the experience of walking on New York City streets. The city changed 49 acres of road space, traffic lanes, and parking spots into bike lanes, pedestrian areas, and public plazas and advocated biking and walking as investment-worthy transportation alternatives.

Ahmedabad, India 

2010: In only a few months of operation, Ahmedabad's Janmarg BRT transformed transit in South Asia and became a model for the future of transportation in India and the world. The cutting-edge BRT is India's first with median stations, pre-paid tickets, sheltered, attractive stations, and at-level boarding. The system is projected to save 288,000 metric tons of  each year. Beyond the bus system, the city has taken measures to incorporate high-quality pedestrian facilities and bike lanes, demonstrating continued leadership in sustainable transport.

Guangzhou, China 

2011: With the opening of the Guangzhou BRT in February 2010, the city asserted its leadership in mass transit planning. In its first year, the VRT began carrying more daily passengers than all the city's five metro lines, logging 800,000 daily passenger trips. The system has more than triple the peak passenger flows of any other BRT system in Asia and carries more passengers than most metros in mainland China. Furthermore, the BRT system integrates well with Guangzhou's newly launched bike share program (June 2010), providing 5,500 bike parking stations at the BRT stations, and dedicated bike lanes along the BRT route.

Medellin, Colombia and San Francisco, US 

2012: As National Geographic notes, “two cities renowned for the cable cars that traverse their hilly terrains” share the 2012 STA.

Medellín, Colombia: During the previous year, Medellín expanded on its significant investments in sustainable transportation. The city's introduction of EnCicla, Latin America's first bike-sharing program, increasing BRT transit, and using progressive techniques such as ridesharing programs and intelligent mobility system (SIMM) have helped make the city more accessible, cleaner and safer. In addition, Medellín has leveraged social media and web content supplements and added value to the city's various transportation options.

San Francisco, US: San Francisco's recent successes in managing and reducing parking demonstrated innovative planning techniques and strong leadership. Working with local businesses and communities, the city implemented SFpark, a parking management system that factors time of day and real-time availability into the pricing. Combined with programs replacing parking spaces with parks, slower speed limits near schools, and working to increase biking opportunities, San Francisco leads the field in taking action to address sustainable transportation.

Mexico City, Mexico 

2013: Mexico City has made significant progress in many different areas of sustainable transportation. From expanding its successful Bike Share program, Ecobici, to revitalizing public spaces, to implementing on-street parking reform, the city has taken many steps to improve mobility and quality of life for its residents. The expansion of Metrobús, the city's BRT system, from the airport to the historic center, has revitalized the downtown area and demonstrated that even old narrow streets can be converted into avenues for better transportation.

Buenos Aires, Argentina 

2014: During the previous year, Buenos Aires implemented several major sustainable transport projects. The city launched two new corridors of its bus rapid transit system, Metrobus: the 23 km corridor of Metrobus Sur and the 2.5 km corridor of 9 de Julio. In addition, the city converted dozens of blocks in the city center into a pedestrian-friendly environment with pedestrian walkways, expanded sidewalks, and new protected cycle lanes.

References 

International awards
Sustainable transport
Urban planning
Awards established in 2005
Community awards
Environmental awards